The Balint Balassi Memorial Sword Award is a European award for literature presented in Budapest since 1997. The native form of this name is Balassi Bálint-emlékkard (Balassi Bálint-emlékkard). This award commemorates the 16th century Hungarian poet Bálint Balassi. The memorial sword is presented annually to an outstanding Hungarian poet, and to a foreign poet for excellence in translation of Hungarian literature, including the works of Balassi. The sword itself is a replica of those sabres that the 16th century Hungarian cavalry wore during the sieges of fortresses. They are the work of a contemporary swordsmith. This award is presented each year on Bálint's (Valentine's) Day, February 14, in the city of Buda. The celebration venue is traditionally the Hotel Gellért.

The advisory board 
The founder of the new award is Pal Molnar journalist, his fellows are Gabriella Lőcsei journalist, József Zelnik writer and András Rubovszky hotelier. In addition, all past award winners automatically become board members, so the literary profession makes up the majority.

Global focus 
In the beginning only Hungarian poets received the Balassi sword, but since 2002, each year, a foreign literary translator has also been recognized.  Since then the board has viewed Balassi's sword as a literary prize of European scope. But since then it has been received by Asian and American poets as well, making it an award of global scope.

Balassi Mass
Since 2008, the Balint Balassi Memorial Swords have been blessed during a Balassi Mass held a few days before the award ceremony.  On January 25, 2013, in the presence of some three hundred Hungarians, Bishop Laszlo Kiss-Rigo blessed the two swords during a Mass celebrated in Saint Stephen's Cathedral, Vienna.

The prize itself
In addition to the sharp, dangerous weapon - which is made by József Fazekas armourer - the winners receive a diploma, a limited-edition porcelain statue from the famous Herend manufacture and a bottle of wine.  The particular wine is selected at a national tasting competition in the preceding year, and as a result this champion wine is entitled to don the “Balassi's sword” label.

Past recipients
 1997 Bálint Tóth
 1998 Kornél Döbrentei and Albert Wass
 1999 Gáspár Nagy
 2000 Ferenc Buda and Attila Gérecz (posthumously)
 2001 József Utassy
 2002 Árpád Farkas and, for translation, Ernesto Rodrigues (Lisbon)
 2003 Benedek Kiss and, for translation, Teresa Worowska (Warsaw)
 2004 László Vári Fábián and, for translation, Armando Nuzzo (Rome)
 2005 István Ferenczes and, for translation, Tuomo Lahdelma (Jyväskylä)
 2006 Sándor Csoóri and, for translation, Lucie Szymanowska (Prague)
 2007 János Csokits and, for translation, Dursun Ayan (Ankara)
 2008 Simon Serfőző and, for translation, Yuri Gusev (Moscow)
 2009 István Tari and, for translation, Ganbold Daváhügijn (Ulaanbaatar)
 2010 István Ágh and, for translation, John Ridland (Santa Barbara)
 2011 Menyhért Tamás and, for translation, Ivan Canev (Sofia)
 2012 József Tornai and, for translation, Gabriel Zanmaku Olembe (Kinshasa)
 2013 Márton Kalász and, for translation, Jean-Luc Moreau (Paris)
 2014 Ferenc Kulcsár and, for translation, Sander Liivak (Rakvere)
 2015 Anna Kiss and, for translation, Muzaffar Dzasokhov (Vladikavkaz, Ossetia)
 2016 Sándor Agócs and, for translation, Harada Kiyomi (Tokyo)
 2017 János Szikra and, for translation, Nelson Ascher (São Paulo)
 2018 László Lövétei Lázár and, for translation, Marin Georgiev (Sofia)
 2019 Gábor Nagy and, for translation, Paskal Gilevski (Skopje)
 2020 Noémi László and, for translation, Vahram Martirosyan (Yerevan)
 2021 László Kürti and, for translation, Ross Gillett (Melbourne)
 2022 Lajos Bence and, for translation, Elena Lavinia Dumitru (Roma)

References

Sources

 — Past recipients
Petőfi — Irodalmi Múzeum
 — Lotuskitap.Com
 — Litera.Hu
 — felvidek.ma
 — Report on felvidek.
 — Balassi Mass in Szeged, Hungary, 2012.
 — Balassi Mass in Vienna, Austria, 2013
 — Balassi Mass in Gyula, Hungary, 2014.
 — Balassi Mass in Hodmezovasarhely, Hungary, 2015.
 — Celebration in Budapest, 2016.
 —  Interview with Ridland about the sword
 — The founder's home page
 — Ridland is awarded
 — Culture.Hu
 — Babelmatrix
 — John the Valiant from S. Petőfi and J. Ridland
 — A translation from Yuri Gusev
 — A translation from Ernesto Rodrigues
 — News about Dursun Ayan's book
 — Kormend.hu
 —  Balassi Sword Wine Muster
 — Celebration '2015
 — Article about 21. celebration — Los Angeles Best Deals
Lövétei kapta a legrangosabb magyar irodalmi díjat
Huszonharmadszor adták át a Molnár Pál által alapított díjat
Í legrangosabb magyar irodalmi díj körmendi költőé lett

External links

Award celebration, 2010. (video)
Award celebration, 2009
Award celebration, 2008
Award celebration, 2007
Award celebration, 2007
AllThatIsHungarian minden-ami-magyar.hu
tertia.hu
kulturport.hu
mno.hu
kulturport.hu
munder.wordpress.com
demokrata.hu
musorujsag.mno.hu
litera.hu
Osset translator
Official page

 
Hungarian literary awards
Awards established in 1997